William R. Nojay (born Nogaj; November 24, 1956 – September 9, 2016) was an American politician and member of the New York State Assembly. He represented the 133rd Assembly District, which includes parts of Steuben and Monroe counties and all of Livingston County.

Early life and education
Nojay was born and raised in Rochester, New York, where his father worked at Eastman Kodak. His surname was originally "Nogaj", but he changed the spelling to match the pronunciation. He earned a bachelor's degree from Colgate University and graduated from Columbia University with degrees from their law school and business school.

Career
In 1996, Nojay was appointed by Governor George Pataki as commissioner of the Rochester Genesee Regional Transportation Authority. He also served on the Executive Committee of the Genesee Transportation Council and as chairman of the Regional Trails Initiative Steering Committee for the Rochester region, and as chief operating officer of Detroit's transportation system under Mayor Dave Bing.

Nojay supported several international democratic movements, working in Nepal, Ukraine, Afghanistan, and Libya. He also worked extensively in Cambodia on behalf of the Khmer People's National Liberation Front, a right-wing opposition party to the People's Republic of Kampuchea regime. He was the director and secretary treasurer of the Foundation for Democracy in Iran.

After redistricting, Nojay challenged and defeated Steuben County Legislator Randy Weaver, winning a vacant seat in the newly created 133rd Assembly District. He also hosted a regionally syndicated conservative talk radio show, which predated his election to the state legislature. The program originated from WYSL.

Nojay supported Donald Trump's 2016 presidential campaign, and he served as co-chair of its New York campaign committee. He had asked Trump to run for governor of New York in 2013.

Death
On September 9, 2016, Nojay committed suicide by firearm near his family's plot at Riverside Cemetery in Rochester, New York. He was due in court that day to face fraud charges related to his legal work, which were subsequently sealed.

Nojay was already running for re-election as assemblyman, and the following Tuesday, September 14, 2016, he posthumously defeated Richard Milne, his challenger in the primary election for the Republican nomination. As a result, a Republican party committee selected former Assemblyman Joseph Errigo to replace Nojay in the general election, which Errigo won.

Assembly committees
Committee on Cities
Committee on Consumer Affairs and Protection
Committee on Election Law
Committee on Tourism, Parks, Arts and Sports Development
Committee on Transportation

References

External links
New York State Assembly member website

1956 births
2016 deaths
Republican Party members of the New York State Assembly
Politicians from Rochester, New York
American chief operating officers
Colgate University alumni
Columbia Law School alumni
Columbia Business School alumni
American talk radio hosts
Businesspeople from Rochester, New York
New York (state) lawyers
American politicians who committed suicide
Suicides by firearm in New York (state)
21st-century American politicians
20th-century American businesspeople
20th-century American lawyers